The 27th New York Infantry Regiment was an infantry regiment formed in Elmira, New York, to fight and defend the United States during the American Civil War.  The regiment was also known as the "Union Regiment".

History

The regiment was organized on May 21, 1861, at Elmira, New York. Muster was called on June 15, 1861. The unit was enrolled for two-years of service.

Regimental organization

Company A – recruited principally in Westchester County
Company B – recruited principally in Wayne County
Company C – recruited principally in Broome County
Company D – recruited principally in Broome County
Company E – recruited principally in Monroe County
Company F – recruited principally in Broome County
Company G – recruited principally in Livingston County
Company H – recruited principally in Livingston County
Company I – recruited principally in Allegany County
Company K – recruited principally in Orleans County

Service
This regiment was organized by Col. Henry W. Slocum at Elmira, New York, and accepted by the State on May 21, 1861. The regiment mustered June 15, 1861, and left New York for Washington, D.C., on July 10, 1861. They were attached to Porter's Brigade, Hunter's Division, McDowell's Army of Northeast Virginia until August 1910. Next they were attached to Heintzelman's Brigade, Division of the Potomac, to October 1861. Slocum's Brigade, Franklin's 1st Division, 1st Army Corps, Army of the Potomac, to May 1862. And 2nd Brigade, 1st Division, 6th Army Corps, to May 1863.

Advance on Manassas, Va., July 16–21, 1861. First Battle of Bull Run, Va., July 21. Duty in the Defenses of Washington, D.C., until March, 1862. Expedition to Pohick Church October 3, 1861. Advance on Manassas, Va., March 10–15, 1862. McDowell's advance on Fredericksburg April 4–12. Ordered to the Peninsula, Virginia, April 22. Siege of Yorktown, Va., April 24-May 4, on transports. West Point May 7–8. Near Mechanicsville May 20. Seven days before Richmond June 25-July 1. Gaines' Mill and Chickahominy June 27. White Oak Swamp and Glendale June 30. Malvern Hill July 1. At Harrison's Landing until August 16. Movement to Fortress Monroe, thence to Centreville August 16–28. In works at Centreville August 28–31, and cover Pope's retreat to Fairfax Court House September 1.

During the Maryland Campaign from September 6–22, they were at Crampton's Gap, South Mountain, September 14. Battle of Antietam September 16–17. Duty in Maryland until October 29. Movement to Falmouth, Va., October 29-November 19. Battle of Fredericksburg, Va., December 12–15. "Mud March" January 20–24, 1863. At Falmouth until April.

Chancellorsville Campaign April 27-May 6. Operations about Franklin's Crossing April 29-May 2. Maryes Heights, Fredericksburg, May 3. Salem Heights May 3–4. Banks' Ford May 4. Mustered out May 31, 1863, expiration of term. Three years' men transferred to 121st Regiment New York Infantry.

Time line

Total strength and casualties
Regiment lost during service 2 Officers and 72 Enlisted men killed and mortally wounded and 2 Officers and 70 Enlisted men by disease. Total 146.

The 27th New York Volunteer Infantry Regiment was reformed following the Civil War to replace the 3rd New York Volunteer Infantry Regiment that was disbanded.

Further reading

Books
  Buell, Dexter E. A brief history of Company B, 27th regiment N.Y. volunteers, its organization and the part it took in the war. Printed at the Office of the Republican. Lyons: 1874.
  Fairchild, Charles Bryant. History of the 27th regiment N.Y. vols., being a record of its more than two years of service in the War for the Union, from May 21, 1861, to May 31, 1863. With a complete roster and short sketches of Commanding officers. Also, a record of experience and suffering of some of the comrades in Libby and other Rebel prisons. Compiled by C. B. Fairchild, of Company "D." Published under the direction of the following committee: Gen. H. W. Slocum [and] Capt. C. A. Wells. Binghamton, Carl & Matthews, printers [1888].
  Hall, Henry Seymour. "Experience in the Peninsular and Antietam campaigns, January 3, 1894." MOLLUS-Kan160-84.
  Hall, Henry Seymour. "Fredericksburg and Chancellorsville, April 4, 1894. MOLLUS-Kan 185-205.
  Hall, Henry Seymour. "Personal experience in organizing volunteer soldiers in April, 1861, and participating with them in the first battle of Bull run, July 21, 1861." A paper prepared and read before the Kansas commandery of the M.O.L.L.U.S., May 4, 1892.
  Hall, Henry Seymour. "Personal experience under Generals Bumside and Hooker, in the battles of Fredericksburg and Chancellorsville, December 11, 12, 13 and 14, 1862, and May 1, 2, 3 and 4, 1863." A paper read [April 4, 1889] before the Kansas commandery of the Military order of the loyal legion of the United States.
  Hall, Henry Seymour. "Personal experience under General McClellan, after Bull run, including the Peninsular and Antietam campaigns, from July 27, 1861, to November 10, 1862." A paper prepared and read before the Kansas commandery of the M.O.L.L.U.S., January 3, 1894.
  Hall, Henry Seymour. "A volunteer at the first Bull run, May 4, 1892." MOLLUS-Kan 143-59.
  Kilmer, George Langdon. "The Army of the Potomac at Harrison's landing." Battles and Leaders II 427-8.
  Merrell, William Howard. Five months in Rebeldom; or, notes from the diary of a Bull run prisoner, at Richmond, by Corporal W. H. *  Merrell, Color guard, Co. E, 27th regiment, N.Y.S.V. Rochester: Adams & Dabney, 1862.

External links
  Civil War in the East:  27th New York Infantry Regiment "Union Regiment"
   Family Search:  27th Regiment, New York Infantry
  New York State Military Museum:  27th Infantry Regiment

References

Military units and formations established in 1861
Infantry 027
1861 establishments in New York (state)
Military units and formations disestablished in 1863